Salient Minus Ten is a 2017 science fiction short film written and directed by Emma Dark.

Plot

The plot of Salient Minus Ten focuses on Adam Harper, who unexpectedly finds himself thrust into a brutal game of life and death.

Production

Salient Minus Ten was funded via the crowdfunding website Indiegogo, where it raised 109% of its goal. Alan Austen, who stopped acting in 2005, was asked by Dark to audition for the lead role in the film after meeting her at the Dale-Con Sci-fi Convention, and later found that he was successful in securing the role. Several shots were filmed at the Barbican Estate in the City of London. Several crew members from Dark's previous film, Seize the Night, returned to work on Salient Minus Ten.

The first trailer was released on August 31, 2017, and the film premiered at the 2017 British Horror Film Festival. It had its Canadian premiere at the Little Terrors Short Film Festival on April 23, 2018.

Awards

Salient Minus Ten won the award for Best Director at the Starburst Fantasy Awards 2018.

Release

The film was released on YouTube on May 27, 2020.

References

External links
 

2017 films
2017 short films
British horror short films
Films shot in London
Science fiction short films
Crowdfunded films
2010s English-language films